Harrow Hill may refer to:

Harrow Hill, Gloucestershire
Harrow Hill, West Sussex
Harrow Hill F.C.
Harrow on the Hill
Harrowgate Hill